Grymeus is a tiny genus of goblin spiders that is found in Australia. They live in leaf litter and under tree bark.

References

Harvey, M.S. (1987).  Grymeus, a new genus of pouched oonopid spider from Australia (Chelicerata: Araneae). Memoirs of the Museum of Victoria 48: 123–130.

Oonopidae
Spiders of Australia
Araneomorphae genera